Liu Chunyan (born 20 August 1966) better known by her nickname Jin Guizi, is a Chinese host and actress. She won the Golden Mic Award in both 1999 and 2011, and received the Flying Apsaras Award for Best Female Voice Actress in 1989.

Biography
Liu was born in Beijing in August 1966, with her ancestral home in Chengdu, Sichuan. She graduated from Communication University of China in 1990, where she majored in broadcast. Liu joined China Central Television in 1991 and has hosted Big Pinwheel since then.

Works

Television
 Big Pinwheel

Film
 Secret Plans (2014)
 Stand By Me Doraemon (dub Chinese mainland edition)(2015)
 Doraemon the Movie: Nobita's Treasure Island (dub Chinese mainland edition)(2018)

Awards
 1989 Flying Apsaras Award for Best Female Voice Actress
 1999 Golden Mike Award
 2011 Golden Mike Award

Personal life
Liu was married to Wang Ning, a news presenter for China Central Television. They have a daughter, Wang Yichen.

References

1966 births
Communication University of China alumni
Living people
Chinese television presenters
CCTV television presenters
Chinese children's television presenters
Chinese television actresses
Chinese voice actresses
Actresses from Beijing
Chinese women television presenters